Massachusetts House of Representatives' 21st Middlesex district in the United States is one of 160 legislative districts included in the lower house of the Massachusetts General Court. It covers part of Middlesex County. Democrat Ken Gordon of Bedford has represented the district since 2013.

Towns represented
The district includes the following localities:
 Bedford
 Burlington
 part of Wilmington

The current district geographic boundary overlaps with those of the Massachusetts Senate's 1st Essex and Middlesex district, 3rd Middlesex district, and 4th Middlesex district.

Former locales
The district previously covered:
 Carlisle, circa 1872 
 Lexington, circa 1872

Representatives
 Samuel P. Breed, circa 1858 
 Stillman E. Parker, circa 1859 
 Thomas J. Flynn, circa 1888 
 Elbridge Gerry Davis, circa 1920 
 Lloyd Makepeace, circa 1920 
 George Louis Richards, circa 1920 
 Louis Harry Glaser, circa 1951 
 Herbert Loring Jackson, circa 1951 
 Angelo Marotta, circa 1975 
 Robert Krekorian
 Bradley Jones Jr.
 Charles A. Murphy
 Kenneth I. Gordon, 2013-current

See also
 List of Massachusetts House of Representatives elections
 List of Massachusetts General Courts
 List of former districts of the Massachusetts House of Representatives
 Other Middlesex County districts of the Massachusetts House of Representatives: 1st, 2nd, 3rd, 4th, 5th, 6th, 7th, 8th, 9th, 10th, 11th, 12th, 13th, 14th, 15th, 16th, 17th, 18th, 19th, 20th, 22nd, 23rd, 24th, 25th, 26th, 27th, 28th, 29th, 30th, 31st, 32nd, 33rd, 34th, 35th, 36th, 37th

Images
Portraits of legislators

References

External links
 Ballotpedia
  (State House district information based on U.S. Census Bureau's American Community Survey).

House
Government of Middlesex County, Massachusetts